The 2012 Hong Kong Super Series is a top level badminton competition held from November 20, 2012, to November 25, 2012, in Kowloon, Hong Kong. It is the twelfth BWF Super Series competition on the 2012 BWF Super Series schedule. The total purse for the event was $350,000.

Men's singles

Seeds

  Lee Chong Wei
  Chen Long
  Chen Jin
  Du Pengyu
  Sho Sasaki
  Kenichi Tago
  Jan Ø. Jørgensen
  Nguyen Tien Minh

Top half

Bottom half

Finals

Women's singles

Seeds

  Wang Yihan
  Li Xuerui
  Saina Nehwal
  Wang Shixian
  Juliane Schenk
  Tine Baun
  Jiang Yanjiao
  Sung Ji-hyun

Top half

Bottom half

Finals

Men's doubles

Seeds

  Koo Kien Keat / Tan Boon Heong
  Cai Yun / Fu Haifeng
  Kim Ki-jung / Kim Sa-rang
  Bodin Issara / Maneepong Jongjit
  Hiroyuki Endo / Kenichi Hayakawa
  Hong Wei / Shen Ye
  Hirokatsu Hashimoto / Noriyasu Hirata
  Angga Pratama / Ryan Agung Saputro

Top half

Bottom half

Finals

Women's doubles

Seeds

  Tian Qing / Zhao Yunlei
  Wang Xiaoli / Yu Yang
  Christinna Pedersen / Joachim Fischer Nielsen
  Shizuka Matsuo / Mami Naito
  Misaki Matsutomo / Ayaka Takahashi
  Eom Hye-won / Jang Ye-na
  Bao Yixin / Tang Jinhua
  Shinta Mulia Sari / Yao Lei

Top half

Bottom half

Finals

Mixed doubles

Seeds

  Xu Chen / Ma Jin
  Zhang Nan / Zhao Yunlei
  Chan Peng Soon / Goh Liu Ying
  Joachim Fischer Nielsen / Christinna Pedersen
  Muhammad Rijal / Debby Susanto
  Fran Kurniawan / Shendy Puspa Irawati
  Danny Bawa Chrisnanta / Yu Yan Vanessa Neo
  Songphon Anugritayawon / Kunchala Voravichitchaikul

Top half

Bottom half

Finals

References
tournamentsoftware.com

Hong Kong Super Series
Hong Kong Open (badminton)
Hong Kong Super Series